Avtovağzal is a Baku Metro station. It was opened on 19 April 2016, connecting the Baku International Bus Terminal to the Baku Metro network.

See also
List of Baku metro stations

References

Baku Metro stations
Railway stations opened in 2016
2016 establishments in Azerbaijan